Ngunguru is a coastal settlement in Northland, New Zealand,  north-east of Whangārei. The Ngunguru River flows between the settlement and a long low sandspit into Whangaumu Bay, which stretches southwards. North of Ngunguru are Tutukaka and Matapouri. Just off the Ngunguru coast are the Poor Knights Islands, a protected marine reserve.

Ngunguru is a Māori-language word meaning "rumbling tides".

History
The waka Tūnui-ā-rangi, which brought Ngāi Tāhuhu to New Zealand according to traditional accounts, visited Ngunguru on its way from the Bay of Islands to Whangarei. The area was named by Puhi, captain of another waka, Mataatua.

In pre-European times, there was a substantial Māori population in the area. A large battle was fought on the Ngunguru sandspit between the local Te Waiariki and Waikato tribes led by Te Wherowhero in 1832.

James Busby, Gilbert Mair and W. J. Lewington bought  at Ngunguru in 1840, although the government disputed the sale for the next 30 years and attempted to buy the land itself from the original Māori owners. They established one of the earliest sawmills in the country at Ngunguru in 1840 to take advantage of the abundant kauri timber. It was water-powered. The mill failed financially in 1844, but others succeeded in the industry and Ngunguru exported timber and especially roofing shingles for many years.

The Melanesian Mission ship  was wrecked in Ngunguru Bay in 1860.

A bullock track was built to Whangarei in the 1860s. In 1892, coal was discovered at Kiripaka, at the headwaters of the Ngunguru River.  were mined until 1921.

The beach settlement developed after roading was improved in the 1950s. An attempt to sell the Ngunguru sandspit for property development in 2005 attracted considerable local opposition, and no buyers. In August 2011 the government purchased the spit from the Todd Property Group. The Department of Conservation will administer the reserve, which is one of a small number of sand spits that are relatively intact from an ecological perspective. Four separate assessments have ranked the spit as nationally significant

In October 2022 the Scotland women's national rugby team visited Ngunguru Marae in what was called a celebration of "the genealogical links between Scotland and Māori" by Te Ao Māori News.

Demographics

Ngunguru had a population of 1,164 at the 2018 New Zealand census, an increase of 246 people (26.8%) since the 2013 census, and an increase of 285 people (32.4%) since the 2006 census. There were 468 households, comprising 558 males and 606 females, giving a sex ratio of 0.92 males per female. The median age was 44.1 years (compared with 37.4 years nationally), with 267 people (22.9%) aged under 15 years, 135 (11.6%) aged 15 to 29, 525 (45.1%) aged 30 to 64, and 240 (20.6%) aged 65 or older.

Ethnicities were 87.6% European/Pākehā, 18.0% Māori, 2.3% Pacific peoples, 2.6% Asian, and 2.8% other ethnicities. People may identify with more than one ethnicity.

The percentage of people born overseas was 21.9, compared with 27.1% nationally.

Although some people chose not to answer the census's question about religious affiliation, 61.6% had no religion, 25.5% were Christian, 0.8% were Hindu, 0.3% were Buddhist and 3.4% had other religions.

Of those at least 15 years old, 222 (24.7%) people had a bachelor's or higher degree, and 153 (17.1%) people had no formal qualifications. The median income was $29,500, compared with $31,800 nationally. 147 people (16.4%) earned over $70,000 compared to 17.2% nationally. The employment status of those at least 15 was that 411 (45.8%) people were employed full-time, 168 (18.7%) were part-time, and 21 (2.3%) were unemployed.

Facilities 
Ngunguru School is a coeducational full primary (years 1–8) school with a roll of  students as of  The school celebrated its centennial in 1970.

Ngunguru also has a sports and recreation club that started in the late 1970s as a leased farm paddock. After that in 1979 the first Club committee took over the land lease and started building up the club's facilities. On the 20th of March 1982 the first official opening of the sports ground took place where a rugby match "between the Northland Vikings (a virtual Northland side) and a star-studded Ngunguru Invitation side which included three former All Blacks" according to the sports center's own page.

References

External links
 Ngunguru School
 Ngunguru Sandspit Protection Society

Whangarei District
Populated places in the Northland Region